The Masseket Azilut describes the sixth (of ten) rank of angels as the Ishim, and names the archangel 'Zephaniel' as their chief. The Ishim are man-like beings which are often used to communicate with people.

See also
 List of angels in theology

References

Individual angels
Archangels
Archangel in Judaism